Bacidia rubella is a species of lichen in the family Ramalinaceae.

It is a host species of the lichenicolous fungus species Muellerella hospitans and Zwackhiomyces polischukii.

References

Ramalinaceae
Lichen species
Lichens of Eastern Europe
Lichens described in 1796
Lichens of Northern Europe
Taxa named by Georg Franz Hoffmann